Leveret may refer to:

 A young hare less than one year old
 HMS Leveret, a name given to several ships of the Royal Navy
  Leveret, an English folk group comprising Andy Cutting, Sam Sweeney and Rob Harbron
 Tu Er Shen or The Leveret Spirit, a Chinese deity